The Northern Rivers Regional Rugby League (NRRRL) is a rugby league competition run in the far north of New South Wales, Australia. It is run under the auspices of the Country Rugby League. The league formed in 2005 as an extended Group 1 Rugby League competition, featuring teams from Group 18 Rugby League. Prior to this, teams from Group 18 played in a competition with teams from the Gold Coast region of Queensland. Both Group 1 and Group 18 continue to run junior competitions.

The competitions run by NRRRL include: First grade, Reserve grade, Under-18's and Ladies League Tag.

Due to sponsorship reasons, in 2007 and 2008 the competition was known as the Retravision Northern League.
As a result of the Coronavirus pandemic, the 2020 competition was suspended until August, with four clubs withdrawing. When it resumed, the competition was split in two due to Queensland border restrictions. The former Group 18 teams contested the Green competition, with the former Group 1 teams contesting the Gold competition.

Teams

The following clubs in NRRRL fielded teams in the 2022 Senior Mens and Ladies League Tag competitions:

Former Clubs
 Grafton Ghosts
 South Grafton Rebels

Juniors
The following clubs fielded teams in 2018 Group 1 junior competitions: Ballina Seagulls, Casino Cougars, Clarence Coast Magpies, Grafton Ghosts, Kyogle Tukeys, Lismore Marist Brothers Rams, South Grafton Rebels

The following clubs fielded teams in 2019 Group 18 junior competitions: Bilambil Terranora Jets, Byron Bay Lennox Head Red Devils/Dolphins, Cudgen Headland Hornets, Mullumbimby Giants, Murwillimbah Colts, South Tweed Koala Bears/Ospreys, Tugun Seahawks, Tweed Coast Raiders, Tweed Heads Seagulls

First Grade Premierships

Ladies League Tag

Juniors 

Both Group 1 and Group 18 run independent junior competitions as was before the merger to form the NRRRL in seniors.

See also

Rugby league in New South Wales
Rugby League Competitions in Australia

Sources

References

External links
 
 

Rugby league competitions in New South Wales
2005 establishments in Australia
Sports leagues established in 2005
Northern Rivers